Minuscule 315 (in the Gregory-Aland numbering), Θε203 (Soden), is a Greek minuscule manuscript of the New Testament, on parchment. Palaeographically it has been assigned to the 13th century.

Description 

The codex contains the text of the Gospel of John on 156 parchment leaves with lacunae (1:1-21; 14:25-15:16; 21:22-25). The text is written in one column per page, in 21-31 lines per page. The biblical text is surrounded by a catena.

Kurt Aland did not place the Greek text of the codex in any Category.

History 

The manuscript was added to the list of New Testament manuscripts by Scholz (1794–1852). 
It was examined and described by Paulin Martin. C. R. Gregory saw it in 1885.

The manuscript is currently housed at the Bibliothèque nationale de France (Gr. 210) in Paris.

See also 

 List of New Testament minuscules
 Biblical manuscript
 Textual criticism

References

Further reading 

 

Greek New Testament minuscules
13th-century biblical manuscripts
Bibliothèque nationale de France collections